Kathy Duva is an American boxing promoter and current CEO of Main Events, a New Jersey-based boxing promotion company. In 2019 she was elected to the International Boxing Hall of Fame.

Early life 
Duva graduated from Montclair State College with a BA in English. Prior to joining Main Events Duva worked as a reporter covering women's sports at the New York Daily News.

Main Events
Kathy along with her husband Dan founded Main Events in 1979. Early on in the company's history Kathy helped Dan sell tickets to fights at the Ice Palace in Totowa, New Jersey.

Sergey Kovalev 
Perhaps Duva's best known client and current Main Events fighter is former Light-Heavyweight champion Sergey Kovalev. Duva signed Kovalev in 2012 following his 2nd round KO of Darnell Boone.

Evan Holyfield 
Duva and Main Events also represent Evan Holyfield, the son of retired world-champion boxer Evander Holyfield.

Personal 
Kathy is the widow of International Boxing Hall of Fame inductee Dan Duva.

References

External links
Main Events

American boxing managers
Year of birth missing (living people)
Living people